Artur Damirovich Sagitov (born 7 January 2000) is a Russian football player. He plays as a centre-forward for Slovenian club Primorje.

Club career
He made his debut in the Russian Premier League for FC Rubin Kazan on 30 November 2018 in a game against FC Dynamo Moscow, as a 90th-minute substitute for Khoren Bayramyan.

On 2 March 2019, he scored his first league goal for Rubin in the 5th minute of added time in a game against FC Akhmat Grozny, giving his team a 1–0 victory after coming in as a substitute 13 minutes earlier.

On 12 August 2019, he joined FC Nizhny Novgorod on loan until 31 May 2020.

For 2020–21 season, he moved on another FNL loan to FC Volgar Astrakhan.

On 18 January 2021, his contract with Rubin was terminated by mutual consent.

On 27 June 2022, Sagitov moved to Primorje in Slovenia.

References

External links
 
 
 

2000 births
People from Yelabuga
Sportspeople from Tatarstan
Living people
Russian footballers
Association football forwards
FC Rubin Kazan players
FC Nizhny Novgorod (2015) players
FC Volgar Astrakhan players
FC Smorgon players
FC Saturn Ramenskoye players
ND Primorje players
Russian Premier League players
Russian First League players
Belarusian Premier League players
Slovenian Second League players
Russian expatriate footballers
Expatriate footballers in Belarus
Russian expatriate sportspeople in Belarus
Expatriate footballers in Slovenia
Russian expatriate sportspeople in Slovenia